Lamprantaugia is a genus of moths in the family Lasiocampidae. The genus was established by Yves de Lajonquière in 1970.

Species
Lamprantaugia gueneana Mabille, 1880
Lamprantaugia tamatavae Guenée, 1865

References

Lasiocampidae